Stay Asleep is the second studio album by American punk band Bigwig. It was released on March 16, 1999.

Track listing

"Freegan" was later released on the compilation album, Short Music for Short People.

References

Bigwig (band) albums
1999 albums
Kung Fu Records albums